The 1963–64 Football League season was Birmingham City Football Club's 61st in the Football League and their 37th in the First Division. They finished in 20th position in the 22-team division, only one point above the relegation places. They lost their opening match in each of the cup competitions, to Port Vale in the third round proper of the 1963–64 FA Cup and to Norwich City in the second round of the League Cup.

Although Birmingham maintained their First Division status, the board of directors asked Gil Merrick to resign as manager. He had been with the club for 25 years as player – he was first-choice goalkeeper for 14 years and, he held the club's appearance record – and manager, having led Birmingham to the 1961 Fairs Cup Final in his first season and to victory in the 1963 League Cup Final to win the club's first and, until 2011, only major trophy. In June, Nottingham Forest's trainer-coach Joe Mallett was brought in with responsibility for "team affairs, including team selection". He was formally appointed manager early in the 1964–65 season.

Twenty-five players made at least one appearance in nationally organised first-team competition, and there were fifteen different goalscorers. Forward Mike Hellawell played in 42 of the 44 first-team matches over the season, and Bertie Auld finished as leading goalscorer with 10 goals, all scored in league competition.

Football League First Division

League table (part)

FA Cup

League Cup

Appearances and goals

Players with name struck through and marked  left the club during the playing season.

See also
Birmingham City F.C. seasons

Notes

References
General
 
 
 Source for match dates and results: 
 Source for lineups, appearances, goalscorers and attendances: Matthews (2010), Complete Record, pp. 362–63.
 Source for kit: "Birmingham City". Historical Football Kits. Retrieved 22 May 2018.

Specific

Birmingham City F.C. seasons
Birmingham City